Vincent Ventura (April 18, 1917 – September 11, 2001) was an American professional baseball left fielder. He played in Major League Baseball (MLB) for the Washington Senators for 18 games during the 1945 season, the last year of the World War II manpower shortage.

His pro career began in 1937 and included two seasons in the New York Yankees' farm system before Washington acquired his contract. He spent 1941 and 1942 with the Class A1 Chattanooga Lookouts, then served in the United States Army Air Forces during both 1943 and 1944 before his discharge. He made his MLB debut on May 8, 1945, in a pinch hitting role against the St. Louis Browns at Sportsman's Park, singling off Nels Potter in a 7–1 Washington defeat. He appeared in 17 more games through June 15, starting 12 games in left field, before returning to Chattanooga.

With Washington, Venture batted .207 in 58 at-bats, with four runs scored and two RBI. All of his 12 hits were singles. He left pro baseball after the 1945 campaign.

References

External links

1917 births
2001 deaths
Akron Yankees players
Amsterdam Rugmakers players
Atlanta Crackers players
Chattanooga Lookouts players
Major League Baseball left fielders
Oswego Netherlands players
Snow Hill Billies players
Baseball players from New York City
United States Army Air Forces personnel of World War II
Washington Senators (1901–1960) players